Langerak may refer to

Geography

Netherlands
 Langerak, Drenthe, a place in the municipality of Coevorden
 Langerak, Gelderland, a place in the municipality of Doetinchem
 Langerak, South Holland, a place in the municipality of Molenwaard
 Langerak, Utrecht, a neighbourhood in the municipality of Utrecht
 Willige Langerak, a place in the Utrecht municipality of Lopik

Denmark
 Langerak (fjord), the eastern part of Limfjorden between Aalborg and Hals

People
 Michel Langerak (born 1968), Dutch footballer
 Mitchell Langerak (born 1988), Australian football goalkeeper

Disambiguation pages with surname-holder lists
Dutch-language surnames